Kevin Hamlin (born June 22, 1979) is an American professional stock car racing driver who has competed in the NASCAR Nationwide Series and NASCAR Camping World Truck Series divisions. He currently is a spotter for Alex Bowman in the NASCAR Cup Series.

He is not related to former Richard Childress Racing crew chief Kevin Hamlin or current NASCAR driver Denny Hamlin.

Racing career
Starting at Pikes Peak in 2005, he piloted the No. 4 GEICO Dodge for the Biagi Brothers Racing team, scoring several top fifteen finishes, and was rumored to be in the car full-time for the 2006 season, but was released in late November 2005, replaced by Mark Green when team owner Fred Biagi declined to renew his relationship with Chip Ganassi Racing. He remains under a driver development program contract with Chip Ganassi Racing.

Hamlin's driving career starting in the Pacific Northwest at the age of 3, racing dirt ovals on a 50cc 3-wheeler.  By the age of 6, he had moved up to Quarter midgets where he won 8 regional and 1 national championship.  At age 14, his family purchased a late model to pursue Kevin's career.  In 1996 Hamlin began racing at the Super Stock division at Evergreen Speedway becoming the youngest winner in the division capturing three feature victories in 1997.

In 1998 Hamlin moved up to the NASCAR Northwest Series, where in 103 career starts he captured 11 wins, 41 top 5 and 62 top 10 finishes.  He was also crowned the 2001 and 2002 Northwest Series Champion and also was named the 2001 and 2003 Most Popular Driver.  Hamlin owns NASCAR Northwest Series records for the youngest ever race winner at 19 years 11 months, youngest ever champion at 21 years 6 months and most consecutive laps led at 275 spanning over 3 races.

In 2006, Hamlin ran Daytona in the Craftsman Truck Series driving the No. 04 Dodge Hemi Dodge for Bobby Hamilton Racing. He also drove the No. 4 Biagi Brothers Racing Dodge in the Daytona Winn-Dixie 250, due to Biagi's driver Auggie Vidovich not having superspeedway clearance. Hamlin also practiced and qualified the No. 41 Ganassi Busch car for several races that Sorenson could not attend due to schedule conflicts with the Cup Series events. During the year, he filled in for teammate Reed Sorenson in 5 non-companion Nextel Cup/Busch Series events, practicing and qualifying Reed's No. 41 Busch car which resulted in two top 5 finishes and three top 10 finishes for Sorenson.

In early 2007, it was announced that Hamlin and Nextel Cup rookie Juan Pablo Montoya would split time driving the No. 42 Texaco Havoline Dodge for Ganassi in the Busch Series. During the Gateway 250, Hamlin earned his first career top 10 finish, a 7th, despite a spin caused by Carl Edwards near the later stages of the race. The next week he followed up with a solid 8th-place finish at the Kroger 200 at O'Reilly Raceway Park at Indianapolis. It was announced later the next week that the #42 Busch team would be shutting down, effectively ending Kevin's season. However, Ganassi said that he would keep Hamlin in the car for the following two races at Michigan and Bristol, but the week after the Michigan race, David Stremme was slated to drive the car at Bristol due to a last minute sponsor change.

Hamlin ran three Nationwide races in 2008 for Pat MacDonald. He finished 24th at Fontana, 21st in Dover, and crashed at Memphis.

In 2009, Hamlin ran a limited Nationwide schedule for a number of teams. At Kentucky, he led two laps while driving for Jay Robinson. Hamlin, normally a spotter for John Andretti, failed to qualify for the Kansas Sprint Cup race for Bob Jenkins.

Starting at Texas in the Fall of 2010 and through the 2011 season, Kevin was the spotter for NASCAR Sprint Cup driver Clint Bowyer. He started 2012 as the spotter for Ty Dillon in the Camping World Truck Series and occasionally for Brendan Gaughan in the Nationwide series. In July 2012, he became the full-time spotter for Kasey Kahne.

Hamlin was a spotter for Change Racing in the 2016 and 2017 24 Hours of Daytona.

Hamlin will move to the #88 team in 2018, spotting for Alex Bowman.

Motorsports career results

NASCAR
(key) (Bold – Pole position awarded by qualifying time. Italics – Pole position earned by points standings or practice time. * – Most laps led.)

Sprint Cup Series

Nationwide Series

Craftsman Truck Series

ARCA Re/Max Series
(key) (Bold – Pole position awarded by qualifying time. Italics – Pole position earned by points standings or practice time. * – Most laps led.)

References

External links
  
 

Living people
1979 births
People from Snohomish, Washington
Racing drivers from Washington (state)
NASCAR drivers
Chip Ganassi Racing drivers